Josip Lukačević (born 3 November 1983) is a Bosnian-Herzegovinian former professional footballer who played as a defender.

Club career
Lukačević spent the latter seasons in the Austrian amateur ranks.

International career
He made his senior debut for Bosnia and Herzegovina in an unofficial match in 2007 against Poland. His sole official match was a June 2008 friendly against Azerbaijan in which he came on as a second-half substitute for Mladen Žižović.

References

External links

1983 births
Living people
People from Brčko District
Croats of Bosnia and Herzegovina
Association football defenders
Association football midfielders
Bosnia and Herzegovina footballers
Bosnia and Herzegovina international footballers
HNK Orašje players
NK Široki Brijeg players
NK Čelik Zenica players
FC Luch Vladivostok players
HNK Cibalia players
NK Osijek players
NK Lučko players
Premier League of Bosnia and Herzegovina players
Russian Premier League players
Croatian Football League players
First Football League (Croatia) players
First League of the Federation of Bosnia and Herzegovina players
Austrian Landesliga players
Austrian 2. Landesliga players
Bosnia and Herzegovina expatriate footballers
Expatriate footballers in Russia
Bosnia and Herzegovina expatriate sportspeople in Russia
Expatriate footballers in Croatia
Bosnia and Herzegovina expatriate sportspeople in Croatia
Expatriate footballers in Austria
Bosnia and Herzegovina expatriate sportspeople in Austria